The Anthem of the 21st of April was the anthem of the ruling military regime during the Greek military junta of 1967–74, de facto used as an unofficial co-national anthem along with the Hymn to Liberty. The anthem glorifies the "national revolution" begun by the regime, which took power with the Coup d'état of 21 April 1967.

Lyrics

See also
 Horst-Wessel-Lied 
 Cara al Sol
 Maréchal, nous voilà !
 Giovinezza

1967 songs
Greek junta
Greek songs
Political songs